Jacopo Sala (born 5 December 1991) is an Italian footballer who plays as a central midfielder for Serie A club Spezia.

Club career

Hamburger SV
Sala came to German side Hamburger SV from Chelsea on a three-year contract, joining former Chelsea teammate Michael Mancienne at the club. He made his competitive debut for Hamburg in a 5–1 home defeat against Borussia Dortmund; he came on as a substitute in the 65th minute, replacing Marcell Jansen.

Hellas Verona

On 24 July 2013, he joined Hellas Verona. Sala made his debut on 1 September 2013, against Roma; the match ended in a 3–0 defeat for Verona.

Sampdoria
On 30 January 2016, Sala joined Sampdoria on loan with an obligation to buy.

SPAL
On 2 September 2019, Sala signed to SPAL.

Spezia
On 5 September 2020, Sala signed to Spezia a 2-years contract. He was the first deal for Spezia in Serie A.

International career
On 15 August 2012, Sala made his debut with the Italy U-21 team in a friendly match against the Netherlands.

Career statistics

References

External links
 

1991 births
Living people
Footballers from Bergamo
People from Alzano Lombardo
Italian footballers
Italian expatriate footballers
Association football midfielders
Bundesliga players
Regionalliga players
Serie A players
Atalanta B.C. players
Chelsea F.C. players
Hamburger SV II players
Hamburger SV players
Hellas Verona F.C. players
U.C. Sampdoria players
S.P.A.L. players
Spezia Calcio players
Expatriate footballers in England
Expatriate footballers in Germany
Italy youth international footballers
Italy under-21 international footballers